CAP may refer to:

Certifications
 Certified Administrative Professional, a IAAP certification
 Certified Authorization Professional, a (ISC)² certification
 Certified Automation Professional, a ISA certification

Companies
 CAP Group (Computer Analysts and Programmers), a UK software company
 CAP S.A., a Chilean mining and steel sector holding company
 CAP Scientific, a British defence software company (1979-1988)
 Christchurch Adventure Park, a mountain bike park opened in Christchurch, New Zealand, in 2016
 Companhia Aeronáutica Paulista, a 1940s Brazilian aircraft manufacturer
 Constructions Aéronautiques Parisiennes, Apex Aircraft training and aerobatic aircraft

Computing
 CAP computer, an experimental machine built in Cambridge, UK
 CAP theorem, Consistency, Availability, Partition-tolerance theorem in computer science
 Camel Application Part, a protocol used in CAMEL servers
 Common Alerting Protocol, an XML based data format for exchanging public warnings between different alerting technologies

Military
 Combat air patrol
 Combined Action Program (AKA Combined Action Platoon), a United States Marine Corps Vietnam era special operation
 Civil Air Patrol, the official US Air Force Auxiliary

Organisations
 Canadian Action Party
 Canadian Association of Physicists
 Cascade AIDS Project
 Center for Adoption Policy
 Center for American Progress, a left-of-centre think tank
 Central Arizona Project
 Central Atlanta Progress
 Chicago Area Project, a juvenile delinquency project
 Christian Appalachian Project, a program to assist disadvantaged persons in Kentucky and West Virginia
 Christians Against Poverty, the UK charity
 Church Action on Poverty, UK national ecumenical social justice charity established in 1982
 College of American Pathologists
 Committee of Advertising Practice
 Committee for Another Policy ( / ), a Belgian political movement
 Concerned Alumni of Princeton
 Congress of Aboriginal Peoples, Canadian aboriginal organization

Projects, programs, policies 
 Canada Assistance Plan, a former transfer program administrated by the government of Canada
 Capital Assistance Program
 Child access prevention laws, which punish adults who allow children to access guns
 Common Agricultural Policy, the European Union's agricultural subsidy system
 Community Access Program, a government of Canada initiative to provide access to the Internet in remote areas
 Community Action Program, Lyndon Johnson's anti-poverty programs
 Community Action Programme, United Kingdom workfare scheme
 Copyright Agency Partnerships, an Australian art commissioning project
 German Climate Action Plan 2050, a climate protection policy document approved in late-2016

Science and medicine
 CaP, prostate cancer
 CAP (protein), cyclase-associated protein
 Carrierless amplitude phase modulation
 Catabolite activator protein, a regulatory protein for mRNA transcription in prokaryotes that binds cyclic AMP
 Cellulose acetate phthalate, a cellulose-based polymer
 Community-acquired pneumonia, a common but potentially-dangerous infectious disease of the lower respiratory tract
 Cumulative accuracy profile is used in data science to visualize the discriminative power of a model

Other
 Carlos Andrés Pérez (1922-2010), twice President of Venezuela
 CAP Markets, social franchise and supermarket chain in Germany
 Capital Airlines, the ICAO airline designator for this airline
 Causal adequacy principle, a philosophical claim made by René Descartes
 Central Arizona Project, the Colorado River diversion canal in Arizona
 Chip Authentication Program, using EMV smartcards to authenticate online banking transactions
 Coded Anti-Piracy, an anti-piracy system for motion picture prints exhibited theatrically
 Consolidated Appeals Process, a funding mechanism used by humanitarian aid organisations
 Codice di Avviamento Postale, literally Postal Expedition Code, Italy's postal code system
 Estadio CAP, a football stadium in Talcahuano, Chile

See also

CAP code (disambiguation)
Cap (disambiguation)
Capp (disambiguation)
CAPPE (disambiguation)